Roman Polanski (born 1933) is a French-Polish filmmaker.

Filmography

Feature films

As director

As writer

Short films 
Student

Professional

Advertisement

Performances

See also 

 Weekend of a Champion

References 

American filmographies
Director filmographies
 Filmography
Male actor filmographies
Filmography